John of Soissons may refer to:

John I, Count of Soissons (d. aft. 1115)
John II, Count of Soissons, trouvère
John III, Count of Soissons
John IV, Count of Soissons
John V, Count of Soissons
John of Soissons, royal bailli of Cyprus, father of Margaret of Soissons, Queen of Armenia, exiled in  1365
John of Luxembourg, Count of Soissons
John, Count of Soissons and Enghien (d. 1557)